Winston Churchill Avenue may refer to:

 Winston Churchill Avenue, Dominican Republic
 Winston Churchill Avenue, Gibraltar
 Avenue Winston-Churchill, in the 8th arrondissement of Paris